Huvaa is a Maldivian romantic drama web television series developed for Baiskoafu by Fathimath Nahula. The series revolves around a large happy family and the impact of an incident that turns their lives upside down while revenge and discord rip the family apart. The series is produced by Baiskoafu.

The series stars Yoosuf Shafeeu, Sheela Najeeb, Mohamed Faisal, Aminath Rishfa, Ravee Farooq, Mariyam Azza, Ibrahim Jihad, Arifa Ibrahim, Ali Azim, Roanu Hassan Manik, Mariyam Shakeela, Mohamed Waheed, Ahmed Easa, Irufana Ibrahim, Mariyam Haleem, Huneysa Adam and Jadhulla Ismail pivotal roles. From the second season, Shafeeu replaced Faisal as the co-director while Abdulla Muaz replaced Farooq for the role Azim. The first episode of the series was released on Baiskoafu on 29 November 2018.

Plot

Season 1
Hassan (Roanu Hassan Manik) and Maariya (Arifa Ibrahim) are a cheerful and wealthy couple living their old-aged lives with their children, Nazim (Mohamed Faisal), Hanim (Yoosuf Shafeeu), Azim (Ravee Farooq), Ganim (Ali Azim) and Hanim's wife, Sheeza (Sheela Najeeb). Nazim, the accountable member of the family leads the family business and notices that its accountant, Jihad (Ali Shazleem) is involved in a financial scam. Hoping to eliminate the threat, Jihad assigns a group of thugs to murder Nazim but his younger brother, Hanim unintentionally gets involved in the assault and is ultimately killed by them, interrupting the peace of the family. Meanwhile, Azim is romantically attracted to married woman, Minha (Mariyam Azza) who is suffering a domestically abused marriage by her drunk husband, Mauroof (Ahmed Easa). After their third divorce, Mauroof manipulates Minha to consummate a marriage with Azim, only to remarry him after the divorce.

In an interrogation session with Jihad, Nazim realizes that he has been adopted by Hassan and Maariya. This leads him to search for his birth mother, Khadheeja (Mariyam Haleem), an underprivileged orphan, who had to handover baby Nazim to the family as he was a result of a brutal rape by an invader. During this visit, Nazim bumps into Shauna (Aminath Rishfa), a pretty young woman who was initially in a relationship with his cousin, Akmal (Ibrahim Jihad), a womanizer. The youngest of the family, Ghanim, initiates a romantic affair with Shaha (Irufana Ibrahim), the girlfriend of Munthasir (Abdullah Shafiu Ibrahim), one of the thugs involved in Hanim's murder.

Nazim encounters with his father, Fuad, and narrowly escapes from a death trap, which leads the latter to be self-poisoned in the process. As the newly-wed brides enter the family, Akmal becomes distressed welcoming Shauna as his sister-in-law. Meanwhile, he befriends with Shaha and together they conspire against the whole family, each with their personal vendetta. From threatening Shauna to plotting against Nazim and Sheeza, they succeed in breaking the family into pieces. However, soon Azim realizes the wrongdoing by them and put the puzzle pieces together to prove Akmal intends to eliminate Nazim from the family business and Shaha plans to save Munthasir from the death penalty.

Season 2
Hoping to evade the trouble of Zoya (Nashidha Mohamed), a mentally unstable woman, Nazim reveals that she is his half-sister, only for her to find out later that she actually is a result of an extramarital affair by her mother (Aminath Rasheedha). Akmal blackmails Shauna with explicit photos and videos of their previous affair, into having intimacy with her. Mauroof seeks help of a black magic practitioner (Ali Farooq) to cast a spell on the relationship of Minha and Azim.

Cast and characters

Main
 Mohamed Faisal as Ahmed Nazim Hassan
 Aminath Rishfa as Shauna
 Sheela Najeeb as Sheeza
 Yoosuf Shafeeu as Haanim
 Ravee Farooq as Azim (Season 1)
Abdulla Muaz as Azim (Season 2)
 Mariyam Azza as Minha
 Ahmed Azmeel as Mausoom (Season 2)
 Ibrahim Jihad as Akmal
 Arifa Ibrahim as Maariya
 Roanu Hassan Manik as Hassan
 Ali Azim as Ganim
 Irufana Ibrahim as Saha
 Ahmed Easa as Mauroof
 Mariyam Shakeela as Zubeydha
 Mohamed Waheed as Zareer
 Aminath Rasheedha as Zoya's mother (Season 2)
 Mariyam Haleem as Khadheeja
 Huneysa Adam as Mariyam (Season 1)
 Jadhulla Ismail as Manik (Season 1)
 Nashidha Mohamed as Zoya

Recurring

 Mohamed Azim Abdul Haadi as Fuad Umar
 Ibrahim Shaaif (Season 2)
 Abdullah Shafiu Ibrahim as Munthasir
 Ashraf Mohamed
 Ali Farooq (Season 2)
 Bassam Ahmed
 Hamdhoon Farooq as Shaheem
 Ali Shazleem as Ali Jihad
 Ismail Irushad
 Ahmed Anas
 Rifshan Mohamed as Mahmood
 Ali Nadheeh as Hameem
 Ismail Faalil 
 Abdulla Naseer
 Lahufa Amjad
 Fathmath Sheereen
 Fathimath Nasra
 Aishath Azumath
 Aishath Ashwa
 Mariyam Ashfa
 Jeniffer Riffath
 Munaz Mahir Ali
 Shareefa Manike
 Ahmed Fahudh
 Aishath Naufa
 Mariyam Reem Thaureef

Guest
 Satthar Ibrahim Manik as Sattar (Episode 9)
 Hussain Shadhyaan as Husham (Episode 49)

Production

Development
In February 2018, Fathimath Nahula announced that her upcoming project is being developed as the first Maldivian web-series titled Huvaa. Shooting for the series began on 26 February 2018. On 16 March 2018, Nahula opened the chance for all the interested musicians to compose songs for the series. Filming of the first schedule took place in K. Guraidhoo before halting for Ramazan. Filming for the second schedule took place in Male' and Villimale' and was completed on 31 July 2018. On 7 October 2018, it was revealed that the show will be released on the digital platform, a streaming service application Baiskoafu, which will be launched in November 2018. Serving as the producer of the show, Baiskoafu team builds and developed several props and a specific set to film the series. After the twentieth episode of the second season, the crew announced a "break" citing the filming difficulties during the COVID-19 pandemic.

Casting
It was revealed that a total of over 40 actors will feature in the series, including newcomers and established actors. On 26 February 2018, Nahula announced that Aminath Rishfa, Ibrahim Jihad, Ali Azim and Sheela Najeeb will feature in the series. On 14 March 2018, reports revealed that Mariyam Azza and Yoosuf Shafeeu joins the cast of Huvaa along with Jadhulla Ismail and Mohamed Faisal. Faisal and Shafeeu were also confirmed to work as director of several episodes alongside Nahula. On 17 May 2018, Nahula confirmed that Ravee Farooq was cast as Azim in the series. In an interview regarding the cast, Nahula said; "There will lot of strong characters in the film, and each actor will play a leading role in the series. Specific details are attended to bring out a balanced arc from each character and not to be missed in the huge cast".

Soundtrack

Release
The series was earlier planned to release in April 2018. However the release date was postponed considering "more time" is needed to complete the project in "high standard". The trailer of the series was released on 13 November 2018 at the ceremony held to launch Baiskoafu application. On the same night, the team announced that the series will premier on 29 November 2018.

The first episode of the show was streamed on 29 November 2018. A new episode of the series will be released for streaming every Monday and Thursday. The pilot episode was viewed by more than 16,000 users at the time of release.

References

Serial drama television series
Maldivian television shows
Maldivian web series